Spüligbach may refer to:
Spüligbach (Ilme), a river of Lower Saxony, Germany, tributary of the Ilme
Spüligbach (Lenne), a river of Lower Saxony, Germany, tributary of the Lenne